Asterina hoensonae is a species of pentagonal  starfish in the family Asterinidae. The holotype was collected at Cape Agulhas, South Africa.

Etymology 
The specific epithet "hoensonae" refers to Elizabeth Hoenson of the South Africa Museum who "went to considerable lengths to make available essential loans for this work".

References 

Asterinidae
Starfishes described in 2009